Van Lancker is a surname. Notable people with the surname include:

Alain van Lancker (born 1947), French cyclist
Anne Van Lancker (born 1954), Belgian politician
Bart Van Lancker (1973–2021), Belgian football coach
Eric Van Lancker (born 1961), Belgian cyclist
Jacques Van Lancker (born 1949), Belgian wrestler
Robert Van Lancker (born 1946), Belgian track cyclist
Willem Van Lancker (born 1987), American entrepreneur

Surnames of Dutch origin